Patrick Fee (13 December 1883 – 7 February 1970) was a British boxer. He competed in the men's lightweight event at the 1908 Summer Olympics.

References

External links
 

1883 births
1970 deaths
British male boxers
Olympic boxers of Great Britain
Boxers at the 1908 Summer Olympics
Place of birth missing
Lightweight boxers